Civil War is a power metal band from Falun, Sweden formed in 2012 by several former members of Sabaton. The band adopted the same lyrical themes of war and historical battles that were characteristic of Sabaton. However, unlike Sabaton, many of Civil War's songs focus on American history and conflicts, whereas Sabaton's songs are primarily about European history and conflicts.

History

Formation and The Killer Angels (2012-2014)
In April 2012, guitarists Rikard Sundén and Oskar Montelius, drummer Daniel Mullback, and keyboardist Daniel Mÿhr left the band Sabaton, of which they had been the founding members. They soon teamed up with Astral Doors vocalist Nils Patrik Johansson and soon bassist Stefan 'Pizza' Eriksson was recruited to form the band's lineup.

Initially signed to Despotz Records, the band released a self-titled EP in October 2012, and then immediately began working on their full-length debut album. The Killer Angels was released in June 2013, and reached Gold status in Sweden only two months later. At the same time, the band began playing live shows at various festivals in Sweden, and went on their first tour of Europe in February 2014. Guitarist Petrus Granar was added to the lineup as a seventh full-time member.

Gods and Generals (2015)
The band then signed a deal with Napalm Records and began working on their second studio album, titled Gods and Generals, which was released in May 2015. Shortly before the release of the first single from the album, Bay of Pigs, the band announced that Oskar Montelius and Stefan Eriksson had both left Civil War. Rather than search for replacements, the band decided to continue as a five-piece.

The Last Full Measure and new vocalist (2016-2018)
The band later released their third album, titled The Last Full Measure which was released in November 2016. Vocalist Nils Patrik Johansson departed the band a month later. The rest of the band members held open auditions for a new vocalist, finally settling on Kelly Sundown Carpenter, who was announced as the band's new vocalist on February 9, 2017.

Sabaton 20th Anniversary Concert & Upcoming fourth studio album (2019-present)
On August 1, 2019, Mullback, Mÿhr, and Sundén rejoined Sabaton for the band's 20th anniversary show at Wacken Open Air. For the show, the band headlined both main stages at the same time, with the current Sabaton lineup taking the "Faster" stage, while Mullback, Mÿhr, and Sundén taking the "Harder" stage with Thobbe Englund. On August 2, 2019, the band released the first song with Carpenter on vocals, "Dead Man's Glory". The single featured fellow ex-Sabaton guitarist Thobbe Englund on lead guitar. They later announced on their website that they will soon start recording their fourth album.

On 12 March 2021 the band announced that Thobbe Englund has replaced Rikard Sunden.

On May 24, 2021. It is revealed in the band's Instagram page that Oskar Montelius will be making a guest appearance on backing vocals. This is Montelius' 1st recording with the band since leaving in 2015.

On 7th April 2022, the band's fourth studio album Invaders was announced to be released on June 17th, with the title track released as a single on the same day.

Discography 
Extended Plays
2012: Civil War (EP)
Studio albums
2013: The Killer Angels
2015: Gods and Generals
2016: The Last Full Measure
2022: Invaders
Singles

 2019: Dead Man's Glory

Personnel

Current members
Daniel Mullback — drums, backing vocals (2012–present)
Daniel Mÿhr — keyboards, backing vocals (2012–present)
Petrus Granar — guitars, backing vocals (2014–present), bass (2015–present)
Kelly Sundown Carpenter — lead vocals (2017–present)
Thobbe Englund — guitars (2021–present)

Former members
Rikard Sundén — guitars, backing vocals (2012–2021)
Nils Patrik Johansson — lead vocals (2012–2016)
Oskar Montelius — guitars, backing vocals (2012–2015)
Stefan 'Pizza' Eriksson — bass (2012–2015)

Timeline

References

External links 
 Official Website
 Civil War on Encyclopedia Metallum

Swedish power metal musical groups
Musical groups established in 2012